Stan Renehan (December 24, 1929 – October 27, 1995) was an American sailor. He competed in the 12m² Sharpie event at the 1956 Summer Olympics.

References

External links
 

1929 births
1995 deaths
American male sailors (sport)
Olympic sailors of the United States
Sailors at the 1956 Summer Olympics – 12 m2 Sharpie
Sportspeople from Norwalk, Connecticut